Chaetocraniopsis is a genus of bristle flies in the family Tachinidae. There are about five described species in Chaetocraniopsis.

Species
These five species belong to the genus Chaetocraniopsis:
 Chaetocraniopsis argenticeps Aldrich, 1928 c g
 Chaetocraniopsis chilensis Townsend, 1915 c g
 Chaetocraniopsis obliteratus (Cortes, 1945) c g
 Chaetocraniopsis similis (Townsend, 1928) c
 Chaetocraniopsis transandinum Cortes, 1980 c g
Data sources: i = ITIS, c = Catalogue of Life, g = GBIF, b = Bugguide.net

References

Further reading

External links

 
 

Tachinidae